Luis Candelaria (29 October 1892 - 23 December 1963), was an Argentine Army officer and military aviator who was the first to cross the Andes by aeroplane, in April 1918.

First crossing of the Andes by aeroplane 
Though the Andes have been crossed by balloon in 1916 by Arturo Bradley and Angel María Zuloaga, the attempts to do so by aeroplane by Jorge Newbery (1914) and by Pedro Zanni (1917) were unsuccessful, and in the former case resulted in the death of the pilot.

Lieutenant Candelaria successfully crossed the Andes on 13 April 1918 in a Morane-Saulnier Parasol with an 80 hp rotary engine, taking off from Zapala (Argentina) and landing at Cunco (Chile) after a total flight time of 2 hours 30 minutes during which he reached 4,000 meters of altitude. The Argentine Government granted Candelaria the title of Military Aviator for that feat.

Personal life

Luis Candelaria in popular culture 
 The San Carlos de Bariloche Airport is named Teniente Luis Candelaria, after him.
 A primary school in the city of Zapala, ‘’Escuela Primaria N°3 Teniente Aviador Luis Candelaria’’, is named after him.
 Although he died in San Miguel de Tucumán, Candelaria’s remains are interred at Zapala, as per his wishes; his grave has the inscription "13 de Abril de 1918" (: 13 April 1918).

See also 
 History of aviation
 List of firsts in aviation

References

Further reading 
 “Pioneros del aire en Argentina”, Rumbos Aeronáuticos, issue 26, 2 July 2012  ‘’(accessed 2015-04-26)’’

External links 
 BIOGRAFÍA: PILOTO ARGENTINO "Tte. Ingeniero F.A. -LUIS CENOBIO CANDELARIA – Club de Ciencias Presidente Derqui website  ‘’(accessed 2015-04-26)’’

1892 births
1963 deaths
Argentine military personnel
Argentine aviators